Jaspal Singh Bhatti (3 March 1955 – 25 October 2012) was an Indian television personality known for his satirical take on the problems of the common man. He is most well known for his television series Flop Show, Full Tension and mini capsules Ulta Pulta which ran on Doordarshan, India's national television network, in the late 1980s and early 1990s. He was commonly known as "King of Comedy" and also "King of Satire". He carried out various anti corruption crusades in Chandigarh. His frontal attack on issues like redtapism, nepotism, and corruption was both comic and awakening for masses.

In 2013, he was (posthumously) honoured with the Padma Bhushan, India's third-highest civilian award.

Early background and personal life

Jaspal Singh Bhatti was born on 3 March 1955 in Amritsar, East Punjab, Republic of India into a Punjabi Sikh Rajput family. Bhatti graduated from Punjab Engineering College (PEC) in Chandigarh as an electrical engineer. Bhatti married Savita Bhatti on 24 March 1985, and has a son, Jasraj Bhatti, and a daughter, Raabiya Bhatti. His wife Savita Bhatti was chosen in 2014 Elections as a Candidate of Aam Aadmi Party from Chandigarh, but she opted out.

Flop Show
His low-budget Flop Show TV series in the early 1990s is remembered even today. His wife Savita Bhatti produced the show and acted in all the episodes as his wife. Only 10 episodes were ever produced, but the show has had a long and powerful legacy and is well-remembered. One of his co-actors Vivek Shauq became pretty successful after his stint in Flop Show, having found a solid footing in Hindi cinema.

Subsequent work
Bhatti subsequently acted and directed the popular TV series Ulta Pulta and Nonsense Private Limited for the Doordarshan television network. What attracted audience to his shows was his gift of inducing humour to highlight everyday issues of the middle class in India. Bhatti's satire on the Punjab police Mahaul Theek Hai (1999) was his first directorial venture for a full-length feature film in his native Punjabi language. He played the role of Jolly Good Singh, a guard, in the movie Fanaa. He played a comical college principal in Koi Mere Dil Se Poochhe. He also starred in the comedy Punjabi film Jijaji.

Bhatti acted in Hindi Movie Aa Ab Laut Chalen with Kadar Khan in 1999.

Bhatti appeared in SAB TV's Comedy ka King Kaun as a judge with actress Divya Dutta. In his latest stint, Bhatti and his wife Savita competed in a popular Star Plus show Nach Baliye which went on air in October 2008. The couple demonstrated their dancing and comic skills.

In his later years, Jaspal Bhatti set up a training school and a studio in Mohali near Chandigarh called "Joke Factory".

He also launched a new 52-episode comedy series titled Thank You Jijaji on Sony's family entertainment channel, SAB TV. It was shot at his own MAD Arts film school at Chandigarh.

At a 2009 carnival at Chandigarh, Bhatti put up a stall displaying vegetables, daal and oils. The onlookers were invited to throw rings around them to win these costly goods as prizes, poking fun at the government's failure to control inflation.

In 2009, Bhatti school's, Mad Art's, animation film on female foeticide won the second prize in the Advantage India organised by 1take media. It won a certificate of merit at the IDPA-2008 Awards in Mumbai.

Bhatti was granted the Lifetime Achievement Award, at the first Golden Kela Awards.

Jaspal Bhatti was awarded Padma Bhushan by the Government of India, posthumously on Republic Day 2013 for his contribution to Arts.

Political satire
Bhatti was known for floating his political parties during elections to highlight the problems faced by the general public.

In 1995, he floated the 'Hawala Party' delighting passers-by with his original poker faced take on growing political corruption in the country which was already a hotly discussed topic in the context of the Jain-Hawala Diaries.

In 2002, Bhatti announced that he was starting the "Suitcase Party" & released his manifesto allotting 5 seats to his family & more seats to be decided based on the suitcase size of the prospective candidates.

In 2009, the comedian announced that he was floating the "Recession Party" & Bhajna Amli, alias Gurdev Dhillon, as his party's face from the Ludhiana. In his trademark satirical style, he kept his party's symbol as opium, drugs and alcohol for which he claimed that there will be no shortage of supply if his party is voted to power.

Critical response
India's leading media critic Amita Malik said of him:

Death
Bhatti died in a car accident near Shahkot in Jalandhar district on 25 October 2012, aged 57. The car was being driven by his son, Jasraj Bhatti. Jaspal died just one day before the release of his film Power Cut starring his son Jasraj.

In his remembrance his wife Savita Bhatti organised 'Jaspal Bhatti Humor Festival' which takes place every year on his birth anniversary in Chandigarh.

Awards and honours

Filmography

As actor
 Dil Pardesi Ho Gaya (2013) Filmed Before Death
 Power Cut (2012) – Actor and director
 Dharti (2011) – Surveen's Dad
 Mausam (2011)
 Hum Tum Shabana (2011) Guest Appearance
 Chak De Phatte (2009) – Pyara Singh Lovely
 Ek: The Power of One (2009)
 Fanaa (2006) – Jolly Good Singh
 Nalaik (2006) – Daku Mann Singh
 Mera Dil Leke Dekkho (2006)
 Jija Ji (2005) – Jija Ji
 Kuchh Meetha Ho Jaye (2005) – Ram Saran Dubey
 Nalayak (2005)
 Kuch Naa Kaho (2003) – Monty Ahluwalia
 Tujhe Meri Kasam (2003) – Sardarji
 Jaani Dushman: Ek Anokhi Kahani (2002)
 Koi Mere Dil Se Poochhe (2002) – Naraaz Shankar
 Shakti: The Power (2002) – Nandini's uncle
 Yeh Hai Jalwa (2002) – Buta Singh
 Hamara Dil Aapke Paas Hai (2000) – Balwinder (Balu)
 Khauff (2000) – Hava Singh/Dava Singh
 Woh Bewafa Thi (2000)
 Kartoos (1999) – Mini's uncle
 Mahaul Theek Hai (1999)
 Aa Ab Laut Chalen (1999) – Iqbal
 Jaanam Samjha Karo (1999) – Tubby, Rahul's Secretary
 Kaala Samrajya (1999)
 Wanted: Gurdas Mann Dead or Alive (1994) – Thanedaar

As director
Mahaul Theek Hai (1999) (Also writer and producer)
 Power Cut (2012) (Also writer and producer)

TV serials

References

External links

 
 Official Site Jaspal Bhatti's Official Website

1955 births
2012 deaths
Punjabi people
Indian Sikhs
Male actors in Punjabi cinema
Male actors in Hindi cinema
Male actors from Amritsar
Artists from Amritsar
Punjab Engineering College alumni
Panjab University alumni
Recipients of the Padma Bhushan in arts
Engineers from Punjab, India
People from Amritsar
21st-century Indian male actors
20th-century Indian male actors
Male actors from Chandigarh
Indian male voice actors
Indian male comedians